Huaxiadraco (meaning "Hua Xia [China] dragon") is a genus of tapejarid pterodactyloid pterosaur from the Aptian-age Lower Cretaceous Jiufotang Formation of Chaoyang, Liaoning, China. It is the third valid genus of tapejarid from the Jehol Biota, after Sinopterus and Eopteranodon. It contains one species, Huaxiadraco corollatus, originally assigned to the defunct genus Huaxiapterus.

History of discovery 
 
Huaxiadraco is based on the holotype ZMNH M8131, a nearly complete skeleton. It was originally assigned to the genus Huaxiapterus by Lü Junchang and colleagues in 2006, under the binomial name Huaxiapterus corollatus. Lü et al. also named another species, Huaxiapterus benxiensis, a year later. However, analyses have since found that these species are only distantly related to Huaxiapterus jii, the type species of Huaxiapterus, and thus require a new genus name. A 2023 review of Chinese tapejarids by Pêgas et al. have confirmed these analyses, finding most of them (including Huaxipterus jii) to belong to the coeval Sinopterus dongi, although corollatus was found to belong to a distinct genus. They thus created Huaxiadraco for corollatus, synonymized benxiensis with it, and referred specimens D2525 (previously considered Sinopterus), BMPC 103, 104, and 105 to it.

Classification
The cladogram below follows the 2014 analysis by Brian Andres and colleagues, showing the placement of the three species assigned to Huaxiapterus. within the clade Tapejaromorpha.

In 2019, a different analysis, this time by Alexander Kellner and colleagues, had recovered the "Huaxiapterus" benxiensis and "Huaxiapterus" corollatus in a more derived position within the Tapejarinae, sister taxon to both Eopteranodon and Sinopterus. The cladogram of their analysis is shown below:

 
 
In 2023, Pêgas et al. created a new dataset based on their reassessment of Chinese tapejarids. Their cladogram is shown below:

References 
 

Early Cretaceous pterosaurs of Asia
Tapejaromorphs
Fossil taxa described in 2023
Jiufotang fauna